SEARCH Grants are part of a program established by the 2002 farm bill (P.L. 107-171, Sec. 6301-04) to assist very small communities (under 3,000 in population) in preparing feasibility and environmental studies required to meet water and waste environmental standards. (7 U.S.C. 2009ee).

References 

Farm Security and Rural Investment Act of 2002